Manuel Vicente Díez Cabral (born July 16, 1964 in Santo Domingo) is a Dominican businessman and entrepreneurial leader.

Career
Díez is chief executive and chairman of Diesco, Ltd., and chairman of the board of directors of Cristalia Premium Water, Puerto Rico’s largest bottled water brand company. Also he is chairman of the Consejo Nacional de la Empresa Privada, an organization that agglomerates the entrepreneurship in the Dominican Republic,<ref>{{cite news|title=Reeligen al empresario Manuel Diez Cabral en la presidencia del CONEP|url=http://www.acento.com.do/index.php/news/26955/56/Reeligen-al-empresario-Manuel-Diez-Cabral-en-la-presidencia-del-CONEP.html|accessdate=10 February 2014|newspaper=Acento|date=28 November 2012|location=Santo Domingo|language=Spanish|quote=El Consejo Nacional de la Empresa Privada (CONEP), reeligió a Manuel Diez Cabral como presidente para el período 2013-2015.|url-status=dead|archiveurl=https://web.archive.org/web/20140223035954/http://www.acento.com.do/index.php/news/26955/56/Reeligen-al-empresario-Manuel-Diez-Cabral-en-la-presidencia-del-CONEP.html|archivedate=23 February 2014}}</ref> and chairman of the board of trustees of the Barna Business School. Díez was chairman of the Asociación de Industrias de la República Dominicana (AIRD) and the Asociación Nacional de Jóvenes Empresarios (ANJE)

Family
Díez Cabral comes from a distinguished family. His mother is cousin of President Donald Reid Cabral, kinswoman of writer and diplomat Julio Vega Battle, beauty queen Amelia Vega, anthropologist Bernardo Vega, actress Sarah Jorge León, businessman José Armando Bermúdez Rochet (founder of Bermúdez rum company), poet and diplomat Fabio Fiallo Cabral, and businessman Juan Bautista Vicini Cabral, and descendant of Presidents Marcos Antonio Cabral, Buenaventura Báez, José María Cabral y Luna and Ulises Espaillat.

He is married to Aída Natalie Hazoury Toca (daughter of Romes Hazoury Tomes, Lebanese, and Aída Odette Altagracia Toca Simó, Dominican) and has fathered 2 girls: Daniela Amalia Díez Hazoury and Natalie Sofía Díez Hazoury.

References

External links
  Consejo Nacional de la Empresa Privada, Conoce a Nuestro Presidente
  Industrias PetroQuim S.A., Historia
  Diesco, History

Descendants of Buenaventura Báez
Descendants of Ulises Espaillat
Dominican Republic people of Catalan descent
Dominican Republic people of Cuban descent
Dominican Republic people of French descent
Dominican Republic people of Galician descent
Dominican Republic people of Italian descent
Dominican Republic people of Portuguese descent
Dominican Republic people of Walloon descent
White Dominicans
1964 births
Living people
People from Santo Domingo